The group stage of the 2004 CAF Confederation Cup was played from 7 August to 14 November 2004. A total of eight teams competed in the group stage.

Format
In the group stage, each group was played on a home-and-away round-robin basis. The winners of each group advanced directly to the final.

Groups

Group A
{|class="wikitable" style="text-align: center;"
!style="width:165px;"|Team
!width="20"|Pts
!width="20"|Pld
!width="20"|W
!width="20"|D
!width="20"|L
!width="20"|GF
!width="20"|GA
!width="20"|GD
|-  style="text-align:center; background:#cfc;"
|style="text-align:left;"| Asante Kotoko
|10||6||3||1||2||10||7||+3
|- align=center
|style="text-align:left;"| Enugu Rangers
|10||6||3||1||2||12||6||+6
|- style="background:#fff;"
|style="text-align:left;"| Al-Hilal
|9||6||3||0||3||6||11||+5
|- style="background:#fff;"
|style="text-align:left;"| Petro de Luanda
|5||6||1||2||3||5||9||-4
|}

|}

Group B
{|class="wikitable" style="text-align: center;"
!style="width:165px;"|Team
!width="20"|Pts
!width="20"|Pld
!width="20"|W
!width="20"|D
!width="20"|L
!width="20"|GF
!width="20"|GA
!width="20"|GD
|-  style="text-align:center; background:#cfc;"
|style="text-align:left;"| Hearts of Oak
|13||6||4||1||1||10||5||+5
|- align=center
|style="text-align:left;"| Coton Sport FC
|11||6||3||2||1||9||3||+6
|- style="background:#fff;"
|style="text-align:left;"| Sable FC
|7||6||2||1||3||6||9||-3
|- style="background:#fff;"
|style="text-align:left;"| Santos FC
|3||6||1||0||5||3||11||-8
|}

|}

References

External links
2004 CAF Confederation Cup - goalzz.com

Group stage